Newsis News Agency (Newsis) is a privately owned news agency in South Korea. Newsis' news is only available in Korean.

References

External links
  

2001 establishments in South Korea
News agencies based in South Korea
Mass media companies established in 2001
Mass media in Seoul